Asphalt Man is a 1995 South Korean television series starring Lee Byung-hun, Choi Jin-sil, Jung Woo-sung, and Lee Young-ae. Based on the 1991 comic of the same title by manhwa artist Huh Young-man, it aired on SBS from May 17 to July 6, 1995, on Wednesdays and Thursdays at 21:55 for 16 episodes.

Plot
Kang Dong-joon (Lee Byung-hun) is a young car designer who dreams of starting his own car company in Korea. He tries to get assistance from his father (Park In-hwan), but the family is in financial trouble. His younger brother Dong-seok (Jung Woo-sung) hates their father, and leaves the country to become a car racer in the United States. Meanwhile, his sister Dong-hee (Lee Young-ae) also flees to the U.S. after conceiving a child with a U.S. army soldier.

Cast

Kang family
Lee Byung-hun as Kang Dong-joon 
Jung Woo-sung as Kang Dong-seok (brother)
Lee Young-ae as Kang Dong-hee (sister)
Park In-hwan as Mr. Kang (father)
Choi Jin-sil as Oh Hwa-ryun (Dong-joon's wife)

Other people
Huh Joon-ho as Han Ki-soo 
Kim Soo-mi as Natasha 
Jo Min-su as Bae Jong-ok 
Kim Soo-ji  as Song-yi (Natasha's daughter)
Lee Jung-gil as Son Ki Joon
Byun Hee-bong
Song Jae-ho
Daniel Beauchamp as Tom (American Soldier)

Production
Filming took 5 months, at the Hyundai auto factory plant in Ulsan and in Dongducheon, including 45 days of overseas location shoots in the United States, which was rare at that time for a Korean drama. The U.S. scenes were filmed in Death Valley and Silver Peak, Alpine County in California. The snow rally in the drama's climax was shot in Utah, though several cast and crew members reportedly suffered from oxygen deficiency.

Various models of Hyundai Motors were featured in the drama as concept cars, production models and Rally vehicles, such as the Accent and the Elantra/Avante. In particular, the Tiburon was first introduced in the scene of Dong-joon's Death Valley Rally.

References

External links
 Asphalt Man official SBS website  (archived)
 Asphalt Man at SBS Global

Seoul Broadcasting System television dramas
1995 South Korean television series debuts
1995 South Korean television series endings
Korean-language television shows
Television shows based on works by Huh Young-man
South Korean action television series
South Korean romance television series
1990s romance television series
1990s South Korean television series